Ebba Gripenstedt (3 June 1894 – 21 December 1950) was a Swedish fencer. She competed in the women's individual foil events at the 1928 and 1936 Summer Olympics.

References

External links
 

1894 births
1950 deaths
People from Nyköping Municipality
Swedish female foil fencers
Olympic fencers of Sweden
Fencers at the 1928 Summer Olympics
Fencers at the 1936 Summer Olympics
Sportspeople from Södermanland County
Ebba
20th-century Swedish women